Chitral is a tehsil located in Lower Chitral District (Chitral District until 2018), Khyber Pakhtunkhwa, Pakistan.

References

Chitral District
Tehsils of Khyber Pakhtunkhwa